Antiochus Theos may refer to:

 Antiochus II Theos (286 BC–246 BC), third king of the Seleucid Empire
 Antiochus I Theos of Commagene (died 38 BC), king of Commagene